Edermünde is a municipality in northern Hesse, Germany.

Geography

Location
Edermünde lies in the north of the Schwalm-Eder district not far southwest of Kassel. This is where the river Eder empties into the river Fulda. The constituent community of Besse is nestled in the Langenberge range that rises to the west.

Constituent communities
The community consists of the centres of Besse, Grifte, Haldorf and Holzhausen am Hahn.

Neighbouring communities
Edermünde is surrounded by four neighbouring communities:

 Baunatal in the north (borders directly)
 Guxhagen in the east (across the Fulda)
 Gudensberg in the south (borders directly)
 Niedenstein in the west (across the Langenberge)

Politics

Municipal partnerships
  Terenten (Terento), South Tyrol, Italy, since 1989.

Culture and sightseeing

Museums
 Heimatmuseum ("Homeland Museum") in Haldorf (in former herdsman's house)
 Dorfmuseum Holzhausen ("Holzhausen Village Museum") in the DGH (Holzhausen Culture and History Club)

Buildings
 "Fortress church" in Besse

Natural monuments
 River Hahn in Holzhausen

The basalt knoll offers an outstanding view of the surrounding area. The path up to the plateau was built anew by Holzhausen citizens in the years 1999 and 2000 and is in good hiking condition.

Sons and daughters of the community
 Eckebrecht von Grifte (mediaeval military man)

References

External links
 Community's official website

Schwalm-Eder-Kreis